Udea calliastra is a moth of the family Crambidae. It is endemic to the Hawaiian islands of Maui, Kauai, Molokai, Oahu and Hawaii.

The larvae of subspecies U. c. synastra feed on Peperomia latifolia and Peperomia membranacea.

Subspecies
Udea calliastra calliastra (Kauai)
Udea calliastra hyadnthias Meyrick, 1899 (Molokai, Maui)
Udea calliastra synastra Meyrick, 1899 (Oahu, Molokai, Hawaii)

External links

Moths described in 1899
Endemic moths of Hawaii
Biota of Maui
calliastra